Siasi, officially the Municipality of Siasi (Tausūg: Kawman sin Siasi), is a 2nd class municipality in the province of Sulu, Philippines. According to the 2015 census, it has a population of 67,705 people.

Geography

Barangays
Siasi is politically subdivided into 50 barangays.

Climate

Demographics

Economy

Notable people
Samuel K. Tan - Historian and educator, chairman of the National Historical Institute from 1997 to 1999
Maria Lourdes Sereno - former Chief Justice of the Philippine Supreme Court
Ongina - drag performer, participated in the first season of RuPaul%27s Drag Race

References

External links
 Siasi Profile at PhilAtlas.com
 [ Philippine Standard Geographic Code]
   Siasi Profile at the DTI Cities and Municipalities Competitive Index
 Philippine Census Information
 Local Governance Performance Management System

Island municipalities in the Philippines
Municipalities of Sulu